The National Museum of Contemporary Art (or MNAC) is a contemporary art museum in Bucharest, Romania. The museum is located in a new glass wing of the Palace of the Parliament, one of the largest administrative buildings in the world.

See also
 List of national galleries

External links

Art museums and galleries in Bucharest
Contemporary art galleries in Europe
Romania